Operation Green Hunt is the name used by the Indian media to describe the "all-out offensive by paramilitary forces and the states forces" against the Naxalites. The operation is believed to have begun in November 2009 along five states in the "Red Corridor."

The term was coined by the Chhattisgarh police officials to describe one successful drive against the Communist Party of India (Maoist) in the state. It was erroneously used by the media to describe the wider anti-Naxalite operations; the government of India does not use the term "Operation Green Hunt" to describe its anti-Naxalite offensive.

Planning and implementation

In October 2009, the Central Reserve Police Force (CRPF) announced that it was in the final stages of planning the offensive and had received approval from the Union-led government. The Commando Battalion for Resolute Action (CoBRA) would take the lead in the operations against Maoist insurgents. But in September 2009, the media had already reported a "massive 3 day joint operation" by the CoBRA and Chhattisgarh police against the Maoists in Dantewada.

At the beginning of November 2009, the first phase of the operation began in Gadchiroli district. As many as 18 companies of the central paramilitary forces were moved into the area in anticipation of the operation.

In April 2010, Mark Sofer had a conversation with Buddhadeb Bhattacharjee and M. K. Narayanan on the subject of the "Maoist extremism" and West Bengal's internal security, and offered assistance by Israel in the state's battle against the Maoists.

Initially in 2009, the government of India had decided to move 80,000 central paramilitary personnel to wage offensive against the Maoists, strengthened by a fleet of 10 armed helicopters from the Indian Air Force. On 3 January 2013, the government of India issued a statement that it is deploying 10,000 more central paramilitary personnel in Bastar, Odisha and some parts of Jharkhand. By May 2013, about 84,000 troops from the CRPF had been stationed in the Red corridor to beef up the offensive. Apart from the paramilitary personnel, the SAPF personnel deployed in operations against the Maoists are estimated to number around 200,000. In his analysis in March 2014, Gautam Navlakha has claimed that 286,200 CRPF personnel along with 100,000 personnel from other central paramilitary forces and the SAPF are now engaged in the offensive against the CPI (Maoist) in 10 states of India. On 8 June 2014, the Minister of Home Affairs officially approved the deployment of another 10,000 troops from the paramilitary forces to fight against the Maoists in Chhattisgarh.

The Times of India, in May 2013, stated that the Ministry of Home Affairs has decided to induce 10,000 more paramilitary personal to move "towards a fight to finish war against Maoists in Red Zone."

The Indian Army has also been stationed in the Red corridor, however, the Army claims that it is present there to train the paramilitary personnel to fight against the Maoists and denies its direct role in the offensive operations. The Chief of the Army Staff and the 7 army commanders in mid-2011 had assessed that, if required, about 60,000-65,000 troops from the Indian Army would need to be induced in Andhra Pradesh, Bihar, Chhattisgarh, Jharkhand, Madhya Pradesh, Maharashtra, Odisha and West Bengal to battle the Naxalites. On 30 May 2013, the Indian Air Force's Air Chief Marshal declared that apart from the currently operating MI-17 helicopters, the Indian Air Force is inducing a fleet of MI-17V5 helicopters to "provide full support to anti-Naxal operations."

Recently in August 2014, the Ministry of Home Affairs stated that it is "sending" 2,000 personnel from the Naga Battalions of the Nagaland's Indian Reserve Battalions (IRB) in Chhattisgarh's Bastar to attack the Maoists, which according to The Economic Times, would make Bastar "the most–militarised zone in India." The Naga Battalion personnel are being send to fight the Maoists for a second time, with having battled the Maoists once before in West Bengal.

The Indian armed forces' personnel use satellite phones and they also have access to unmanned aerial vehicles (UAVs). Security forces have been using UAVs in anti-Maoist operations for quite some time in Bihar, Chhattisgarh and Jharkhand. Presently, the UAVs are being provided by the National Technical Research Organisation (NTRO) and Indian Air Force, but they have not been able to yield desired results for the armed forces. Hence, to further advance the offensive, the Defence Research and Development Organisation has taken an initiative to specially develop UAVs with "lower frequency radars" for the armed forces to "track down" the Maoists. The NTRO has specially imported 12 drones from Israel for aerial surveillance of Naxalites' activities in the forest region on Andhra Pradesh–Orissa–Chhattisgarh border.

See also
Naxalites
Timeline of the Naxalite-Maoist insurgency
Operation Steeplechase
Walking with the Comrades

References

External links
Chidambaram says no, but troops believe ‘Green Hunt' exists, The Hindu
"Deep Intelligence" in Bastar: Mapping The Maoists From The Skies
India For Selective Assassination Of  Own Citizens?
Security forces launch "Operation Abujhmad" in Chhattisgarh
Staring at Defeat – Even the security forces know that every starving Indian is a potential Maoist insurgent, OPEN

2009 in India
Aerial operations and battles involving India
Communist Party of India (Maoist)
Conflicts in 2009
Conflicts in 2010
Conflicts in 2011
Conflicts in 2012
Conflicts in 2013
Conflicts in 2014
Counterinsurgency
Manmohan Singh administration
Naxalite–Maoist insurgency
Operations involving Indian special forces
Anti-communist terrorism